Ville de Nantes was a second-rank, 90-gun, steam-powered ship of the line built for the French Navy in the 1850s, lead ship of her class of three ships. The ship was in reserve most of her career and served as a prison ship for Communard prisoners in 1871–1872 after the Paris Commune was crushed by the French government. She was sold for scrap in 1887.

Description
The Ville de Nantes-class ships were repeats of the preceding ship of the line  and were also designed by naval architect Henri Dupuy de Lôme. Their crew numbered 913 officers and ratings.

The Ville de Nantes class were powered by a pair of four-cylinder steam engines that drove the single propeller shaft using steam provided by eight boilers.

The armament of the Ville de Nantes-class ships consisted of twenty-four 30-pounder smoothbore cannon and ten  rifled muzzle-loading (RML) guns on the lower gundeck. On the upper gundeck were twenty-four 30-pounder cannon and ten  Paixhans guns. On the quarterdeck and forecastle were six  Paixhans guns and four 163 mm MLR guns.

Career 
Ville de Nantes conducted trials in 1860 until, in December, she was used as a transport to ferry troops to Brest. Her engine having broke down, she conducted repairs until July 1861, after which she conducted trials until 1862.

After the Paris Commune, Ville de Nantes was used as a prison hulk in Cherbourg. She was eventually broken up in 1887.

Citations

References

Ships of the line of the French Navy
1858 ships
Napoléon-class ships of the line
Ville de Nantes-class ships of the line